{{DISPLAYTITLE:C20H25ClN2O5}}
The molecular formula C20H25ClN2O5 (molar mass: 408.87 g/mol) may refer to:

 Amlodipine
 Levamlodipine (also known as S-amlodipine)

Molecular formulas